Petrolea may refer to:
 Petrolea, former name of Petrolia, California
 Petrolea, former name of Petrolia, Ontario
 Petrolea (album), 2006 album by Slovenian rock band Siddharta

See also 
 Petrolea Vale, an early alternative name for Hartley Vale, New South Wales.